Théophile Obenga (born 1936 in the Republic of the Congo) is professor emeritus in the Africana Studies Center at San Francisco State University. He is a politically active proponent of Pan-Africanism and an Afrocentrist. Obenga is an Egyptologist, linguist, and historian.

Background
Obenga was born in 1936 in Brazzaville, Republic of the Congo.

Théophile Obenga has studied a wide variety of subjects and has obtained a wide range of degrees. His degrees include:

 M.A. in Philosophy (University of Bordeaux, France)
 M.Ed. (University of Pittsburgh, U.S.A.)
 M.A. in History (University of Paris, Sorbonne)
 Advanced studies in History, Linguistics, and Egyptology (University of Geneva, Switzerland); in Prehistory (Institut de Paléontologie Humaine, Paris), and in Linguistics, Philology, and Egyptology (University of Paris, Sorbonne, and College de France)
Théophile Obenga holds a Ph.D. in Letters, Arts and Humanities from Montpellier University, France. He is a member of the French Association of Egyptologists (Société Française D’Egyptologie) and of the African Society of Culture (Présence Africaine). He contributed to the United Nations Educational and Scientific Cultural Organization (UNESCO) program consecrated to writing of the General History of Africa and the Scientific and Cultural History of Humanity. He was, until the end of 1991, Director General of the Centre International des Civilisations Bantu (CICIBA) in Libreville, Gabon. He is the Director and Chief Editor of the journal Ankh.
From January 28 to February 3, 1974, Obenga, Cheikh Anta Diop, and numerous professors from Egypt and Sudan were Africa's representatives to the UNESCO symposium  in Cairo on "The Peopling of Ancient Egypt and the Deciphering of the Meroitic Script".

Linguistic theories
During the 1974 UNESCO Cairo symposium, The peopling of ancient Egypt and the deciphering of the Meroitic script, Cheikh Anta Diop and Obenga were among its participants. Adding on to Diop's African origin of ancient Egypt model, Theophile Obenga focused on linguistics. Obenga criticized Joseph Greenberg's method, and he sought to prove that the Egyptian language is genetically related to languages outside of Northern Africa. Obenga analyzed typological similarities in grammar as well as examined the word forms of ancient Egyptian and numerous African languages such as Wolof. He considers the similarities between Egyptian and the languages he analyzed to be greater than the similarities between the Semitic, Berber, and Egyptian languages, which Greenberg grouped together as the Afroasiatic languages.

Obenga proposes three major language families for Africa:

 Berber
 Khoisan
 Paleo African/Negro-Egyptian.

Obenga developed Cheikh Anta Diop's Paleo African language family as  Negro-Egyptian. This family is composed of:

 Ancient Egyptian
 Chadic
 Coptic 
 Cushitic
 Niger-Kordofanian
 Nilo-Saharan

Today the Obenga school is the most popular branch of African Historical Linguistics.

Bibliography
 L’Afrique dans l’Antiquité – Égypte ancienne – Afrique noire, Paris: Présence Africaine, 1973.
 Introduction à la connaissance du peuple de la République Populaire du Congo, Brazzaville: Librairies Populaires, 1973.
 Afrique centrale précoloniale – Documents d’histoire vivante, Paris: Présence Africaine, 1974.
 La Cuvette Congolaise. Les hommes et les structures. Contribution à l’histoire traditionnelle de l’Afrique centrale, Paris: Présence Africaine, 1976.
 Le Zaïre, Civilisations traditionnelles et Culture moderne (Archives culturelles d’Afrique centrale), Paris: Présence Africaine, 1977.
 La vie de Marien Ngouabi 1938-1977, Paris: Présence Africaine, 1977.
 Stèles pour l’avenir (poèmes), Paris: Présence Africaine, 1978.
 Pour une Nouvelle Histoire, essai, Paris: Présence Africaine, 1980.
 La dissertation historique en Afrique. A l’usage des étudiants de Première Année d’Université, Dakar: NEA, Paris: Présence Africaine, 1980.
 Sur le chemin des hommes. Essai sur la poésie négro-africaine, Paris: Présence Africaine, 1984.
 Littérature traditionnelle des Mbochi. Etsee le Yamba, Paris: Présence Africaine, 1984.
 Les Bantu, Langues-Peuples-Civilisations, Paris: Présence Africaine, 1985.
 Discours et écrits politiques de Jacques Opangault, Paris: Présence Africaine, 1987.
 Astres si longtemps. Poèmes en Sept Chants, Paris: Présence Africaine, 1988, Collection: Poésie.
 La Philosophie africaine de la période pharaonique – 2780-330 avant notre ère, Paris: L’Harmattan, 1990.
 Ancient Egypt and Black Africa: A Student's Handbook for the Study of Ancient Egypt in Philosophy, Linguistics and Gender Relations, edited by Amon Saba Saakana, London: Karnak House, 1992.
 Origine commune de l'égyptien ancien, du copte et des langues négro-africaines modernes – Introduction à la linguistique historique africaine, Paris: L’Harmattan, 1993.
 La Géométrie égyptienne – Contribution de l'Afrique antique à la mathématique mondiale, Paris: L’Harmattan / Khepera, 1995.
 Cheikh Anta Diop, Volney et le Sphinx – Contribution de Cheikh Anta Diop à l'historiographie mondiale, Paris: Présence Africaine / Khepera, 1996.
 L’histoire sanglante du Congo-Brazzaville (1959-1997)– Diagnostic d’une mentalité politique africaine, Paris: Présence Africaine, 1998.
 Pour le Congo-Brazzaville – Réflexions et propositions, Paris: L’Harmattan, 2001, Collection : Études Africaines.
 Le sens de la lutte contre l’africanisme eurocentriste, Paris: Khepera / L'Harmattan, 2001.
 L’UNIVERSITÉ AFRICAINE dans le cadre de l’Union Africaine, Paris: Pyramide Papyrus Presse, 2003,  Collection : Narmer.
 African Philosophy – The Pharaonic Period: 2780-330 BC, Dakar: Per Ankh, 2004. (Traduction de l’ouvrage La Philosophie africaine de la période pharaonique 2780-330 avant notre ère, Paris: L’Harmattan, 1990).
 L’Égypte, la Grèce et l’école d’Alexandrie – Histoire interculturelle dans l’Antiquité – Aux sources égyptiennes de la philosophie grecque, Paris: Khepera / L’Harmattan, 2005.

See also
Afrocentric historiography
Black nationalism

References

External links 

Khainga O'okwemba, "Kenya: Meeting Great Egyptologist Theophile Obenga", The Star, 25 June 2015, via AllAfrica.

Living people
1936 births
Foreign Ministers of the Republic of the Congo
Government ministers of the Republic of the Congo
Pseudolinguistics
Republic of the Congo Africanists
Republic of the Congo diplomats
Republic of the Congo emigrants to the United States
Republic of the Congo pan-Africanists
San Francisco State University faculty
University of Bordeaux alumni
University of Pittsburgh alumni
University of Paris alumni
University of Geneva alumni